Robert Bryant Melson (June 5, 1971 – June 8, 2017) was an Alabama prison inmate who was executed for the 1994 murders of three workers at a Popeyes restaurant in Gadsden.

Murders
On the night of April 15, 1994, Melson and his accomplice Cuhuatemoc Hinricky Peraita (born May 19, 1976) entered a Popeyes restaurant in east Gadsden through the back door of the building after employee Darrell K. Collier unlocked it to allow fellow employees Nathaniel Baker and Bryant Archer to take out the trash. Upon entry, Melson and Peraita ordered Archer, Baker, Collier, and another employee, Tamika Collins, into the restaurant's office and demanded that they empty the safe. They complied, after which Melson ordered the group to get inside the restaurant's freezer. Shortly after locking them in the freezer, Melson unlocked the door and opened fire. Baker, Collier and Collins all died of their wounds before paramedics arrived. Archer was shot four times, but he survived and was able to crawl to the restaurant's office to call 911.

Legal proceedings
Melson was convicted of his role in the crime, sentenced to death on May 17, 1996, and placed on death row under Alabama Department of Corrections ID 0000Z601. Peraita was sentenced to life without parole. He killed a fellow inmate on December 11, 1999, and was given a death sentence in October 2001. Melson had two execution dates set in 2010, both of which were stayed. On April 5, 2017, Melson had an execution date set for June 8, 2017. He received a temporary stay from an appellate court on June 2, but the U.S. Supreme Court vacated the stay on June 6 without comment. At 5:45 p.m. on the night of the execution, the U.S. Supreme Court granted a temporary stay so Justice Clarence Thomas could review Melson's appeals. The stay was later lifted and the execution began at 9:55 p.m. Melson was pronounced dead at 10:27 p.m.

See also
 List of people executed in Alabama
 List of people executed in the United States in 2017

References

1971 births
2017 deaths
1994 murders in the United States
21st-century executions by Alabama
21st-century executions of American people
Executed African-American people
Male murderers
American people executed for murder
People convicted of murder by Alabama
People executed by Alabama by lethal injection
21st-century African-American people